Edward Brzozowski (born 11 October 1920 – 25 June 1983) is a Polish football player and coach.

Career

Playing career
Brzozowski played for Polonia Warszawa and gained 6 caps for Poland.

Coaching career
Brzozowski managed Polonia Warszawa, Pogoń Szczecin, Odra Opole, Zawisza Bydgoszcz, Arka Gdynia, Hutnik Warszawa and Lech Poznań

References

1920 births
1983 deaths
Footballers from Warsaw
Association football defenders
Polish footballers
Poland international footballers
Polonia Warsaw players
Polish football managers
Polonia Warsaw managers
Arka Gdynia managers
Lech Poznań managers
Lechia Gdańsk managers
Odra Opole managers
Pogoń Szczecin managers
Zawisza Bydgoszcz managers
Gwardia Warsaw managers
Hutnik Warsaw managers